Popovskoye is a rural locality (a village) in Kubenskoye Rural Settlement, Vologodsky District, Vologda Oblast, Russia. The population was 32 as of 2002.

Geography 
The distance to Vologda is 70.5 km, to Kubenskoye is 28 km. Dolmatovo is the nearest rural locality.

References 

Rural localities in Vologodsky District